Benjamin Lorton Crompton (born 1974) is an English actor and standup comedian, best known for his performance on the BBC sketch show Man Stroke Woman and as Colin in the BBC Three sitcom Ideal. From 2012 to 2019, Crompton portrayed Eddison Tollett on the HBO high-fantasy series Game of Thrones.

Career
Crompton appeared in the 2002 film All or Nothing, the TV series Clocking Off, and the TV movie Housewife, 49. He played Ewan in 102 Dalmatians. He appeared as Colin in the BBC Three sitcom Ideal with Johnny Vegas, and as Keith in the BBC Three series Pramface from 2012 until 2014. In 2011, he appeared as William Nutt in the television film The Suspicions of Mr Whicher for ITV. In 2012, he appeared in the film Blood.

He appeared in both series of the BBC TV sketch show Man Stroke Woman.

He has had a recurring role as Eddison Tollett since Season 2 of the television fantasy drama series Game of Thrones.

In 2014, he appeared as a ship's officer in the second episode of series 8 of the Doctor Who television series, "Into the Dalek", and as Mr. Bagwell in the ITV drama The Great Fire.

In 2016, he appeared in the music video "Old Skool" by English electronic group Metronomy.

Personal life
In 2008, Crompton married Liv Lorent, with whom he has two children.

Filmography

Film

Television

References

External links

1974 births
English male television actors
Living people
Male actors from Greater Manchester
20th-century English male actors
21st-century English male actors
Actors from Stockport